Endri Vrapi (born 23 May 1982, in Tiranë) is an Albanian retired footballer who last played as a defender for Kosovan club Liria.

Club career

Early career
Vrapi began his career while still a teenager, playing for Partizani Tirana. Regarded as one of the best young Albanian talents at the time, he was also captain of the Albania under-19 team. He worked his way up through the ranks at Partizani Tirana and joined the first team during the 2001–02 season, though he did not feature in any league game that season. This prompted Vrapi to sign with Lushnja, a weaker team in the Albanian Superliga, to gain some experience.

At Lushnja he quickly established himself in the first team. He played seventy-six games and scored four goals for the club between 2002 and 2005. His impressive displays prompted one of the best teams in the country, Elbasani, to sign the left back in 2005. His most successful season came at Elbasani during his first spell there in the 2005–06 season. He played thirty-four games and scored two goals that season and was one reason Elbasani won the Albanian championship. After his triumph with Elbasani, in 2006 Vrapi moved to Teuta Durrës, where he almost repeated his success with Elbasani, when Teuta Durrës finished second behind KF Tirana in the Albanian Superliga. During the 2006–07 season he played twenty-nine games and scored two goals. After spending only one season in Durres, Vrapi changed teams again, moving back to KF Tirana. This turned out to be a mistake. KF Tirana struggled all season, finishing a disappointing sixth place in the Albanian Superliga, the team's lowest league position in years. During that poor season Vrapi played twenty-seven games without scoring a goal. The Albanian international defender decided to go back and play where he had spent the best years of his career, Elbasani. He was greeted by his former team with open arms as they had paid a fee believed to be in the region of $140,000 for re-signing the left back.

Dinamo Tirana

On 30 June 2009, Vrapi signed a temporary deal with Dinamo Tirana for the club European campaign. He played entire match on 2 July 2009 in the Europa League first qualifying round against Lahti as Dinamo was defeated 4–1. He was replaced after 78 minutes in the returning leg as Dinamo managed to win 2–0 which was not enough as Lahti progressed 4–3 on aggregate.

Skënderbeu Korçë

On 30 June 2010, Vrapi was transferred to Skënderbeu Korçë, and was given the number 4 shirt for the 2010–11 season. He made his debut in team's opening match of 2010–11 season against his former team Besa Kavajë, but the match was suspended after 88th minute at 0–1 due to riots on the terraces. Skënderbeu was awarded by the FSHF 0–2. One week later, Vrapi played for the first time at Skënderbeu Stadium in a 2–0 defeat of Teuta Durrës.

Return to Tirana

On 29 August 2013, Vrapi left Skënderbeu after three seasons to return to Tirana by penning a one-year contract, taking squad number 44 for the upcoming season. He debuted in team's opening match of the 2013–14 season against KF Laçi, starting and playing the full 90 minutes in a goalless home draw. Vrapi, however, was one of the best players on the field.

In December, Tirana suffered a surprise elimination from Lushnja in the 2013–14 Albanian Cup second round, with Vrapi appearing in both legs unable to avoid the elimination. During the first part of the season, Tirana experienced its worst period of all time, winning 3 out of 16 league matches. Vrapi played in the back in 10 on these matches. Tirana also changed management three times, employing Nevil Dede, Alpin Gallo and later Gugash Magani. In December, the team was ranked in the last position with only 10 points from 13 matches, 7 points away from the safe zone.

However, with Magani in charge, Tirana changed completely the face by winning three of four matches of February, including the derby against Partizani Tirana thanks to the winner of Gilberto. Vrapi's first score-sheet contribution came later on 26 April by scoring in the 2–1 home win over fellow relegation strugglers Vllaznia Shkodër.

Tirana mathematically assured survival on 3 May 2014 in the penultimate week of the league after a 2–2 away draw against Flamurtari Vlorë, in a match where Vrapi played 90 minutes. His finished his season by making 26 marches, including 23 in league, netting once. He left the club as a free agent in mid-August after failing to find a way with club directors for the new contract.

Partizani Tirana
Vrapi completed a transfer to his first professional team Partizani Tirana on 1 September 2014 as a free agent, penning a one-year contract with an option of a further one. His presentation was made the same day, where he was given squad number 44 for 2014–15 season. His competitive debut occurred on 10 September in the matchday 3 against Skënderbeu Korçë, playing full-90 minutes in a 1–0.

During the first part of the season, Vrapi, alongside his defence partners Rrahmani, Fejzullahu and Cululi helped Hoxha to go 1,084 minutes without conceding a goal in Albanian Superliga to break the 30-year-old record set by the goalkeeper of KS Labinoti Elbasan (modern day called KF Elbasani), Bujar Gogunja, who kept intact net goal for 1037 minutes.

He concluded 2014–15 with 26 appearances, all in league, as Partizani finished 3rd in championship, returning in European competitions after seven years. During the season, Vrapi played mainly as left-back, but in several times he was used also as a centre-back.

Vrapi started the 2015–16 by playing full-90 minutes in the 1–3 away defeat at Strømsgodset in the 2015–16 UEFA Europa League first qualifying round. He also played full match in the returning leg by Partizani lost 0–1 at the last moments and was eventually eliminated 1–4 on aggregate.

On 13 January 2016, Partizani confirmed via their Facebook page that they have terminated the contract with Vrapi by mutual consensus.

Vllaznia Shkodër
Three days after becoming free agent, Vrapi agreed terms and joined Albanian Superliga strugglers Vllaznia Shkodër until the end of the season.

International career

Vrapi has been an Albanian international for four years, collecting 10 appearances. He debuted with Albania on 1 March 2006, playing the last 11 minutes of the 2–1 home defeat against Lithuania.

Career statistics

Clubs

International

Honours

Club
Elbasani
 Albanian Superliga: 2005–06

Besa
 Albanian Cup: 2009–10

Skënderbeu
 Albanian Superliga: 2010–11, 2011–12, 2012–13

Individual
Albania Superliga Footballer of the Year: 2005–06

References

External links
 
 

1982 births
Living people
Footballers from Tirana
Albanian footballers
Association football defenders
Albania international footballers
FK Partizani Tirana players
KS Lushnja players
KF Elbasani players
KF Teuta Durrës players
KF Tirana players
FK Dinamo Tirana players
Besa Kavajë players
KF Skënderbeu Korçë players
KF Vllaznia Shkodër players
KF Liria players
Kategoria Superiore players
Kategoria e Parë players
Football Superleague of Kosovo players
Albanian expatriate footballers
Expatriate footballers in Kosovo
Albanian expatriate sportspeople in Kosovo